Gathorne Gathorne-Hardy, 1st Earl of Cranbrook,  (born Gathorne Hardy; 1 October 1814 – 30 October 1906) was a prominent British statesman, Conservative politician and key ally of Benjamin Disraeli. He held cabinet office in every Conservative government between 1858 and 1892 and notably served as Home Secretary from 1867 to 1868, Secretary of State for War from 1874 to 1878 and Secretary of State for India until 1880. Gathorne-Hardy oversaw the British declaration of war for the Second Anglo-Afghan War.

Background and education 

Gathorne Hardy was the third son of John Hardy, of the Manor House Bradford, and Isabel, daughter of Richard Gathorne. His father was a barrister, the main owner of the Low Moor ironworks and also represented Bradford in Parliament; his ancestors had been attorneys and stewards to the Spencer-Stanhope family of Horsforth since the beginning of the 18th century. He was educated at Shrewsbury School and Oriel College, Oxford, and was called to the Bar, Inner Temple, in 1840. He established a successful legal practice on the Northern Circuit, being based at Leeds, but was denied when he applied for silk in 1855.

Early political career, 1847–1874

Hardy had unsuccessfully contested Bradford in the 1847 general election.  However, after his father's death in 1855 he was able to concentrate fully on a political career, and in 1856 he was elected for Leominster.  Only two years later, in 1858, he was appointed Under-Secretary of State for Home Affairs in the second administration of the Earl of Derby.  He remained in this office until the government fell in June 1859.

In 1865 Hardy reluctantly agreed to stand against William Ewart Gladstone in the Oxford University constituency.  However, on 17 July 1865, he defeated Gladstone by a majority of 180, which greatly enhanced his standing within the Conservative party thanks to the influence of rural clergy voters, but still did not come first in the poll.  Gladstone's response was "Dear Dream is dispelled.  God's will be done." The Conservatives returned to office under Derby in 1866, and Hardy was appointed President of the Poor Law Board, with a seat in the cabinet.  He was admitted to the Privy Council at the same time.  During his tenure in this office he notably carried a poor law amendment bill through parliament.  Cranbrook also supported the Reform Act of 1867, which significantly increased the size of the electorate to one in five.  By May Disraeli had recognised Gathorne Hardy's value to the Conservatives as a rising star in the Commons, proving a capable debater, a resilient antagonist to Gladstone, and nobody's fool. In 1867 he succeeded Spencer Horatio Walpole as Home Secretary and was forced to deal with the Fenian Rising of that year.  By accepting an amendment that all ratepayers should be enfranchised, Disraeli had created a new Victorian constitution, which surprisingly Hardy and others were prepared to accept. One new entrant in 1868, an admirer of Disraeli, the Radical, Sir Charles Dilke thought Hardy the most eloquent Englishman, whose talents were wasted in the Conservative Party.  But Hardy himself, not so easily deceived, remained a stalwart Tory to the end.

The next year, Benjamin Disraeli succeeded Derby as Prime Minister, but the Conservative government resigned in autumn 1868, after both the Queen and Disraeli delayed dissolution to register a new electorate, which since 1865 had accepted postal votes.  The Liberals came to power under Gladstone.  In opposition, Hardy occasionally acted as opposition leader in the House of Commons when Disraeli was absent.

There was criticism of the Anglican Church in Ireland, which Liberals intended to disestablish in its entirety.  A committed Anglican, Hardy opposed the measure on religious grounds:"I say that the Church of Ireland has made many converts; not, it may be, by violent controversial proceedings, but by a quiet influence which has affected the minds of those who have been around her clergy, and who have gradually become leavened by their sentiments".Being an orthodox Anglican he considered fragmentation of the church as contrariwise to Conservative principles. In the "I have faith in the principles we are professing, and when I am told by the right hon. Gentleman the President of the Board of Trade, and by others who have spoken like him, that all thoughtful men are against the Irish Church, that for fifty years every Statesman has looked forward to some such consummation." He spoke manfully in the Irish Church bill debate on 23 March 1869, before Gladstone gave the government's winding-up in one of the greatest oratorical expositions during the second reading. Hardy linked the Irish church bill to the Fenian rising and resulting atrocities, vis-à-vis a Catholic church allegedly willing to sell benefices for money.  Moreover, he directly attacked the Prime Minister's followers whom he accused of being "indebted to the Fenian movement for that tardy measure of justice.  This shows the encouragement to disloyalty given by this measure." And in provoking the government he linked tendentiously Baron Plunket, the nationalist, to the Liberal Party: which no doubt they disowned.

During debates on education Hardy produced eloquent and stinging rebukes that deflected time from Gladstone's Irish reform agenda.  Hardy proved an able lieutenant in the Disraelian tradition, mocking Gladstone's bill's cumbersome progress through the Commons. Gladstone gradually became hotter and bothered by Cranbrook's adroit remarks.  When he was likened to the Hyde Park riots of 1866, the Prime Minister "caused such an explosion of passion and temper."

The defeat threatened Disraeli's party leadership, but despite being considered Hardy declined, whilst the great man was still 'looking over his shoulder'.  On 1 February 1872, Hardy was present at the Burghley House Conference of Tory grandees: only Derby and Disraeli were missing for the discussion about the party's and country's future.  Hosted by Lord Exeter, a Cecil descendant of the Elizabethan Lord Burghley, other Cabinet members were Sir Stafford Northcote, Sir John Pakington, Lord Cairns, and Lord John Manners, a personal friend of Disraeli.  Only Manners and Northcote were prepared to support Disraeli's continued leadership.  The group suggested that Lord Stanley, Derby's son, take the Commons post of party leader.  For his part, the younger Stanley was a very different character than his father.  Short and plump, Stanley was a reformer, open to change, and ideas around progressive politics.  He was also more amenable to Disraeli, recognizing that he was unfit, he did not wish to displace a man whom backbenchers knew was the outstanding parliamentarian.  Stanley's neutrality would convert other cabinet members towards acceptance of the flamboyant Jew.  Latterly Hardy worked well with Disraeli, although they were not close intimates.  At the end of the month the mood in London lifted:  the Prince of Wales was out of trouble, and Hardy amongst others attended a service of thanksgiving and praise at St Paul's on 27 February.

Cabinet minister, 1874–1880
 

In 1874 the Conservatives returned to office under Disraeli, and Hardy was appointed Secretary of State for War, for which he was not best suited.  He should have been offered the Home Office, but this went to a fine debater, Richard Cross.  But the House rose on 7 August, leaving the minister the remainder of the year to settle into departmental work.  Hardy stayed in post for more than four years overseeing the army reforms initiated by his Liberal predecessor Edward Cardwell.  In 1876, Disraeli was elevated to the peerage, and the House of Lords, as Earl of Beaconsfield.  Hardy had expected to become Conservative leader in the House of Commons, but was overlooked in favour of Sir Stafford Northcote; Disraeli disliked the fact Hardy neglected the house to go home in the evening to dine with his wife.

Two years later, in April 1878, Hardy succeeded The Marquess of Salisbury as Secretary of State for India, and the following month he was raised to the peerage as Viscount Cranbrook, of Hemsted in the County of Kent. At the same time, he assumed his mother's maiden surname of Gathorne in addition to that of Hardy at the request of his family. In December 1878, Cranbrook attended court, and heard from the Queen her complaints about Gladstone's mishandling of the Prince of Wales' rejection of the proposal to make him Viceroy of Ireland. Cranbrook remained one of the ministers at the centre of the court being a monarchist, frequently interacting with the Queen and Prince of Wales.  When Gladstone's portrait was shown in public, Cranbrook tactfully observed protocol.

The Eastern Question had posed the biggest single foreign policy dilemma in 1877.  Hardy was in favour of actively pursuing the bankrupted Sultan with a loan, and going to war if necessary to keep Russia out of Constantinople.  He proved one of Disraeli's closest allies in cabinet.  Cranbrook was a relative parvenu; the rich aristocrats wanted peace and so did Gladstone, at any price.  But he was vindicated; when Salisbury swapped sides to support the PM, he was raised to Foreign Minister.  A 'War Party', an Inner Cabinet, sent Royal Navy battleships to defend the Turks against a threatening Russian Army.  At the India Office Cranbrook was forced to deal with the Second Afghan War in 1878, aimed at restoring British influence in Afghanistan.  After a peaceful summer of 1878 deer-stalking in Scotland, Cranbrook returned to a crisis dealing with an ill-prepared Viceroy of India. A full invasion of Afghanistan was ordered on 21 November. The Afghans were defeated within weeks, but the new Third Empire had begun in a state of panic. A peace deal was struck in May 1879, but war again erupted after the British resident, Sir Louis Cavagnari, was murdered by mutinous Afghan troops.  British troops under Frederick Roberts managed once again to restore control.  However, the situation was still volatile when Cranbrook, along with the rest of the government, resigned in April 1880.  As a peer Cranbrook was disqualified from making speeches during elections, which ended in a Liberal majority.  He took a well-earned rest in Italy early in 1881, and was still there when the only one of Disraeli's cabinet absent for the Earl of Beaconsfield's funeral at Hughenden.

Tory grandee
Lord Cranbrook remained at the heart of the party elite.  In 1884 a new Chief Whip, Aretas Akers-Douglas gained promotion from Salisbury partly through the austere influence of this knowledgeable and experienced grandee.  In early 1885 the government was rent with division, Chamberlain refusing to agree with the franchise as 'ransom' of private property.  Cranbrook wrote to Lord Cairns on 9 January, "all this comes from the Irish policy for wh. Mr Gladstone is responsible." The writing was on the wall for the government.  In June 1885 the Conservatives returned to power as "Caretakers", and Cranbrook was made Lord President of the Council.  Cranbrook was shocked to find out that behind the cabinet's back Lord Carnarvon had been negotiating a deal, known in the newspapers as 'Tory Parnellism', with the Irish Party.

For two weeks in early 1886 he again served as Secretary of State for War.  The government fell in January 1886 but soon returned to office in July of the same year after a General Election under a new franchise.  Cranbrook was once again appointed Lord President of the council, in which office he was mainly concerned with education.  He also served briefly as Chancellor of the Duchy of Lancaster in August 1886.  He declined the post of Foreign Secretary in 1886 owing to his inability to speak foreign languages, and also refused the viceroyalty of Ireland.  Perhaps the stolid familiarity of the council was additionally welcome after the turmoil in government caused by Lord Randolph Churchill's erratic, argumentative behaviour.  He remained as Lord President of the council until the second Salisbury ministry fell in 1892.  Shortly after, he was further honoured when he was made Baron Medway, of Hemsted in the County of Kent, and Earl of Cranbrook, in the County of Kent.  In opposition, Cranbrook was a strong opponent of the Second Home Rule Bill, which was heavily defeated in the House of Lords.  He retired from public life after the 1895 general election.

Marriage and family 
Lord Cranbrook married Jane Stewart Orr, daughter of Anglo-Irish landowner James Orr of Hollywood House, County Down, and his wife Jane Stewart in 1838. 

They had three sons and two daughters.

 Lady Margaret Evelyn Gathorne-Hardy (died 11 July 1943), married the Viceroy of India George Joachim Goschen, 2nd Viscount Goschen and had three children. She founded several schools in India and was awarded the Kaiser-i-Hind Gold Medal.
 Lady Edith Elizabeth Gathorne-Hardy (died 8 January 1875), married Sir Henry Graham.

 John Stewart Gathorne-Hardy, 2nd Earl of Cranbrook (22 March 1839 – 13 July 1911) married Cicely Ridgway, daughter of Egyptologist Joseph Ridgway and had seven children.
 Col. Hon. Charles Gathorne Gathorne-Hardy (11 May 1841 – 17 February 1919) of the Grenadier Guards, married Lady Cicely Nevill, daughter of the 2nd Marquess of Abergavenny. 
 Hon. Alfred Erskine Gathorne-Hardy (27 February 1845 – 11 November 1918), a Conservative Member of Parliament and writer. 

One son and two of their daughters predeceased them.

Death 
Lord Cranbrook died at his residence of Hemsted Park in October 1906, aged ninety-two, and was succeeded by his eldest son John. His third son the Hon. Alfred Gathorne-Hardy was also a politician.

See also 
 Premierships of Benjamin Disraeli
 Conservative Party
 British India
 Second Afghan War
 Irish Church Act 1869
 Church of Ireland
 Anglicanism

Notes

References

Bibliography

External links 
 

1814 births
1906 deaths
British Secretaries of State
Chancellors of the Duchy of Lancaster
Earls in the Peerage of the United Kingdom
Knights Grand Commander of the Order of the Star of India
Lord Presidents of the Council
Members of the Privy Council of the United Kingdom
People educated at Shrewsbury School
Alumni of Oriel College, Oxford
Hardy, Gathorne
Hardy, Gathorne
Hardy, Gathorne
Hardy, Gathorne
Hardy, Gathorne
Hardy, Gathorne
Hardy, Gathorne
Hardy, Gathorne
UK MPs who were granted peerages
Gathorne-Hardy family
Peers of the United Kingdom created by Queen Victoria